Itende is an administrative ward in the Mbeya Urban district of the Mbeya Region of Tanzania. In 2016 the Tanzania National Bureau of Statistics report there were 3,846 people in the ward, from 3,490 in 2012.

Neighborhoods 
The ward has 6 neighborhoods.
 Gombe
 Inyala
 Isonta
 Itende Kati
 Itete
 Lusungo

References 

Wards of Mbeya Region